The Śmiała Wisła is a distributary river branch of the Vistula in Poland flowing to Gdańsk Bay.

The Śmiała Wisła is a western border of Sobieszewo Island and was created in 1840 during the flooding when it became a new mouth of the Vistula. Literally it means Daring Vistula.

External links
Map of Śmiała Wisła

0Śmiała Wisła
Rivers of Poland
Rivers of Pomeranian Voivodeship